John Tipton may refer to:

John Tipton (Tennessee frontiersman) (1730–1813), American frontiersman and prominent figure in Tennessee's pre-statehood period
John Tipton (1786-1839), United States Senator from Indiana
John Tipton (Alberta politician) (1849-1914), politician and coal miner in Alberta, Canada
John Beresford Tipton, a fictional character in the American TV series The Millionaire